Macau Business Daily (shortened as MBD), also known as Business Daily, was an English-language daily newspaper launched by De Ficção Multimedia Projects on April 2, 2012.

Macau Business Daily was Macao's main English-language daily newspaper, it ceased publication in 2017.

References

Defunct newspapers published in China
Newspapers published in Macau
English-language newspapers
2012 establishments in Macau
Publications disestablished in 2017